Seán White is an Irish former hurler who played as a left wing-forward for the Offaly senior team.

Born in Banagher, County Offaly, White first played competitive hurling in his youth. He made his senior debut for Offaly during the 1981–82 National League, and played for just one season. During his brief career he experienced little success.

At club level White is a one-time Leinster medallist with St Rynagh's. He also won numerous championship medals with the club.

Honours
St Rynagh's
Leinster Senior Club Hurling Championship (1): 1982 (c)

References

Living people
St Rynagh's hurlers
Offaly inter-county hurlers
Year of birth missing (living people)